Mount Willoughby is a locality in the Australian state of South Australia located about  north-west of the capital city of Adelaide and about  north-west of the town of Coober Pedy.

The locality was established on 26 April 2013 in respect to "the long established local name" which is derived from the pastoral lease.

Mount Willoughby is located on land on the boundary between the Stony Plains and the Great Victoria Desert bioregions which "supports a remarkable collection of habitats, ranging from swamps and grassland to cracking clay pans, spectacular breakaway ranges and vivid red dune country".  The Adelaide-Darwin railway and the Stuart Highway both pass through the locality from south to north while the Woomera Prohibited Area occupies part of the locality’s south-west corner.

The principal land uses within the locality are primary production and conservation with the former being associated with the grazing of cattle in the northern end of the locality and the latter being associated with the Mount Willoughby Indigenous Protected Area in the remainder of the locality.

Mount Willoughby is located within the federal Division of Grey, the state electoral district of Giles, the Pastoral Unincorporated Area of South Australia and the state’s Far North region.

References
Notes

Citations

Towns in South Australia
Places in the unincorporated areas of South Australia
Far North (South Australia)